Daniela Jolanta Denby-Ashe (born 9 August 1978) is an English actress. She is best known for playing Sarah Hills on the soap opera EastEnders,  Margaret Hale on the period drama North and South, and Janey Harper on the BBC sitcom My Family. She also played Lorraine Donnegan on the drama series Waterloo Road.

Early life
Denby-Ashe was born in North West London on 9 August 1978, the daughter of Polish immigrants; her father's original name was Miroslaw Pszkit. Before her parents married, they decided to adopt a more British-sounding surname, so they each chose a surname they liked from the telephone directory and hyphenated them.<ref>'"Believe it or not,  a story behind my last name. My dad came here when he was twelve. My dad was born in Poland. His name was Miroslaw Pszkit (pronounced SHKEET). Needless to say, when he arrived some people wouldn't learn how to pronounce it properly. So just before he and my mum got married they had a look in the telephone directory. One found the name Denby and the other found Ashe. They couldn't decide between them which name to use so they just put them together with a hyphen in the middle. I'm not Pszkit like my dad; I was born with Denby-Ashe on my birth certificate. So that's where my birth certificate comes from." Daniela Denby-Ashe Interview (Summer 1999) , wgazette.com; accessed 9 March 2016.</ref> Denby-Ashe is fluent in English, Polish, and French, learning the latter from her grandmother, who was raised in France until World War II broke out. She began studying ballet at the age of two and tap at a later stage; from the ages of 10 to 16, she attended several drama schools, including the Corona Academy.

Career

Denby-Ashe first gained film experience on the children's video Nursery Rhymes 2 from Pickwick Video. She appeared in many television commercials as a child actor which then led on to children's drama such as Kevin & Co, as well as the Channel 4 sitcom Desmond's.  Denby-Ashe also appeared briefly alongside Jennifer Saunders and Julia Sawalha in season 3 episode 6 of Absolutely Fabulous. Her big break came in 1995 when she landed the role of Sarah Hills in the BBC soap opera EastEnders. She played this character until 1999.

The following year she got the role of Janey Harper in the BBC sitcom My Family. Daniela took a break from My Family for the fourth series in 2003, but returned to the role in 2004. The eleventh and final series first aired on BBC One from June 2011.

In 2005 she took the lead role of Margaret Hale in the BBC TV drama adaptation of Elizabeth Gaskell's North & South, and in 2006 played Mary in the science fiction TV series Torchwood episode Greeks Bearing Gifts.  Her other television roles include Office Gossip, Rescue Me, Is Harry on the Boat?,  and The Afternoon Play. From 2003 she appeared in the Radio 4 comedy Ring Around the Bath.

In 2007, she starred as Robert Maxwell's secretary in Maxwell, a BBC drama about his life.

In December 2008 she appeared in BBC Four's supernatural drama series Crooked House, and in October 2010 she starred in an episode of the ITV detective drama Midsomer Murders. In April 2009 she appeared in the fourth series of the BBC drama Waterloo Road'' as deceitful supply teacher, Jem Allen. In April 2012, she returned to the drama as a new regular character, Lorraine Donegan. The character then appeared regularly throughout the eighth series.

She appeared in two episodes of the BBC sitcom Mum in 2019.

Filmography

References

External links
 

1978 births
Living people
English people of Polish descent
English soap opera actresses
English stage actresses
English television actresses
English radio actresses
Actresses from London
20th-century English actresses
21st-century English actresses